Nothing but the Beat is the fifth studio album by French DJ and record producer David Guetta, released on 26 August 2011. Released as a double album, the first disc features collaborations with artists from the R&B, hip hop and pop worlds such as Lil Wayne, Taio Cruz, Nicki Minaj, Ludacris, Snoop Dogg, Afrojack, Chris Brown, Flo Rida, Usher, Jennifer Hudson, Dev, Timbaland, Jessie J and Sia. Also making appearances are will.i.am, Akon and Ne-Yo, all three of whom previously collaborated with Guetta on his fourth studio album, One Love. In comparison, the second disc features purely instrumental tracks. The album is also Guetta's first album not to feature long-time collaborator Chris Willis on vocals. Critical reviews of the album were mixed.

The album spawned four singles that attained success on the US Billboard Hot 100 – "Where Them Girls At", "Without You", "Turn Me On" and "Titanium" – becoming his third, fourth, fifth and sixth top 20 singles, respectively. On 30 November 2011, the album received a nomination for Grammy Award for Best Dance/Electronica Album at the 54th Grammy Awards. As of October 2012, the album has sold 407,000 copies in the US, and has received platinum certification by the IFPI for sales exceeding 1,000,000 copies throughout Europe. On 26 March 2012, the album was released as a standalone package, via the iTunes Store. This version was previously released through Beatport.

The album was then re-released on 7 September 2012 under the name Nothing but the Beat 2.0. It includes six new tracks including lead single "She Wolf (Falling to Pieces)", which features Sia, who previously collaborated with Guetta on "Titanium". The remixes of this single were released exclusively through Beatport on 7 August 2012. Several tracks from the original album have been removed from the re-release, however all the singles have been retained. A final edition of the album dubbed Nothing but the Beat Ultimate, was released on 10 December 2012 featuring the original album plus all of the new songs from the 2.0 edition – though contained the full-length edits of "Sunshine", "Lunar" and "Metropolis", as opposed to the shorter edits on 2.0 – and a 16-second shorter version of "Where Them Girls At". All ten main singles from Nothing but the Beat, including the Guetta version of "Sweat", have peaked within the top-twenty of the UK Singles Chart and as of January 2015 have all together sold in excess of 4 million copies in the UK.

Singles

"Where Them Girls At" was released as the album's first single on 2 May 2011. The track itself is a collaboration with Flo Rida and Nicki Minaj. The release of the single came earlier than planned after computer hackers managed to obtain an early a cappella version of the song, featuring only the rappers' vocals and added their own production to the song before leaking it. It debuted at number fourteen on the Billboard Hot 100 chart, becoming Guetta's third top twenty hit in the United States. The song charted within the top ten in eighteen countries, and peaked at number one on the UK Dance Chart.

"Little Bad Girl" was released as the album's second single on 27 June 2011. The track itself is a collaboration with Taio Cruz and Ludacris. The music video was released on 18 July 2011. The track entered the top ten in several countries, and peaked at number one in Venezuela. However, the United States was the only territory where the track was not successful, peaking only at number 70. It did, however, fare well on the Billboard Hot Dance Club Songs chart.

"Without You" was released as the album's third single on 14 October 2011. The track itself, originally written and recorded by Taio Cruz, is a collaboration with Usher. The music video was filmed at the end of July 2011. The track was sent to mainstream radio in the United States on 27 September 2011. It was a success worldwide, and reached the top ten in the United States.

"Titanium" was released as the album's fourth international single on 9 December 2011. The track itself is a collaboration with Sia. "Titanium" was initially released as a promotional single from the album, and successfully charted worldwide. It was later released as the album's fifth single in the United States, officially impacting Top 40, Mainstream and Rhythmic radio on 24 April 2012.

"Turn Me On" was released in the U.S., officially impacting Top 40, Mainstream and Rhythmic radio on 13 December 2011. The track itself is a collaboration with Nicki Minaj. It was later released as the album's fifth international single in January 2012. The music video was filmed in November 2011 by director Sanji. The video was released on 31 January 2012.

"I Can Only Imagine" was released as the album's sixth single on 2 May 2012. The track itself is a collaboration with Chris Brown and Lil Wayne. The music video, directed by Colin Tilley, was filmed on 29 May 2012. The video was released on 2 July 2012. The track peaked at number one in Belgium, as well as achieving high success in Poland. The track has also charted in thirteen other territories. It was officially sent to American radio on 7 August 2012, where it peaked at number 44.

Four songs were digitally released as promotional singles for the album: "Titanium" (which later became an official single) on 8 August 2011, "Lunar" (with Afrojack) on 15 August 2011, "Night of Your Life" (featuring Jennifer Hudson) on 22 August 2011 and "The Alphabeat" on 26 March 2012. The first three were released as part of the iTunes Store's countdown to the album's release.

It is noteworthy that all ten main singles from Nothing but the Beat – including "Sweat", Guetta's remix of Snoop Dogg's "Wet" – have peaked within the top-twenty of the UK Singles Chart and as of January 2015 have all together gone on to sell in excess of four million copies in the country.

Critical reception

At Metacritic, which assigns a weighted mean rating out of 100 to reviews from mainstream critics, the album received an average score of 56, based on 17 reviews, which indicates mixed or average reviews. David Jeffries wrote for AllMusic that "Nothing But the Beat offers the same experience as one of Guetta's numerous remix sets", but declared that "something's missing, something along the lines of 'When Love Takes Over'." In the same vein, Al Fox wrote for BBC Music that "Whether you could go so far as to call Guetta an auteur might be pushing it, but it's a cohesive effort, if not quite a work of art." Entertainment Weeklys Mikael Wood praised the tracks "Night of Your Life" and "Titanium" but felt that "the album feels colder than its sweat factor suggests." In an almost neutral review, Jon Dolan wrote for Rolling Stone that the album "shows how good he is at making Eurohouse's thumping trounce and jet-engine synth whoosh feel like natural elements in the hip-hop, R&B and even rock continuum." In his MSN Music "Expert Witness" column, Robert Christgau said that while he "only wish[es] it had a few 'I Gotta Feeling's", "the two Nicki Minaj features come close, Taio Cruz does what he's sposed to for once, the will.i.am preachment makes its escapist statement, and neutering Snoop is fine with both me and the ASPCA."

Ally Carnwath wrote a negative review for The Observer, rating it 1 out of 5 stars, writing that the album's collaborations "struggle to impose any distinctive personality on the overall mood of relentless rictus-grin-inducing euphoria." Tom Ewing from The Guardian criticized Guetta for making "tiring dancefloor fillers" and concluded that "Nothing But the Beat may sound like a one-man hit parade, but it also takes its title far too literally." Eric Henderson wrote negatively for Slant Magazine that "His sound may be the most influential force in pop music today, but he's paradoxically been artistically overshadowed by imitators and innovators alike, all of whom demonstrate a better understanding of power pop's legacy (Lady Gaga's "The Edge of Glory"), dance-floor dynamics (Rihanna's "S&M"), and ridiculous self-awareness (LMFAO's "Party Rock Anthem")."

Track listing 

Notes
 signifies co-producer or additional production by.
 signifies remix production by.

Re-releases

2.0 version 

The album's re-release Nothing but the Beat 2.0 was preceded with the release of "She Wolf (Falling to Pieces)", on 21 August 2012 and eventually came out on 19 November 2012. It is Guetta's second collaboration with Sia following "Titanium". A number of remixes of the track were first made available via Beatport on 7 August 2012, with contributors including Michael Calfan and Sandro Silva. The single was later released physically and digitally on 24 August 2012, in the United Kingdom and Germany. The track was officially sent to American radio on 7 January 2013. "Just One Last Time" was released as the album's ninth overall single on 15 November 2012, and the second from the album's re-release. The track itself is a collaboration with Taped Rai. The track was released in the United Kingdom on 31 December 2012, and became only the second single from the album, following on from "I Can Only Imagine", which did not receive an official physical release. The music video was released on 3 December 2012, again directed by Colin Tilley. "Play Hard" featuring Akon and Ne-Yo has been remixed by Guetta, and this new version was released as the tenth and final single from Nothing but the Beat.

On 11 April 2012, Guetta released his collaboration track with Nicky Romero "Metropolis" through Beatport as the first release of his new label Jack Back Records. A shortened edit of the song was later included in Nothing but the Beat 2.0. On 19 October 2013, a video for "Metropolis" was uploaded to YouTube and, as of April 2014, has over 10 million views. The video, a burn production directed by Mr. Brainwash, opens with a television with text on the screen that reads, "art cannot be criticized because every mistake is a new creation", and contains scenes involving paint, graffiti, the breaking of objects, and Guetta and Romero DJing.

Ultimate version 

 "Play Hard" heavily incorporates the song "Better Off Alone" by Alice Deejay.
Credits adapted from album liner notes.

Documentary 
A feature-length biographical documentary about Guetta was released on 1 September 2011. Also named "Nothing but the Beat", the documentary follows Guetta on tour around the world and behind the scenes of major concerts, featuring interviews with collaborative and associated artists, friends, colleagues, and his wife to chronicle his rise from underground house DJ to global superstar. It was produced alongside the energy drink brand Burn. Featured artists include will.i.am, Kelly Rowland, Snoop Dogg, Ludacris, Taio Cruz, and dance music legends Fatboy Slim, David Morales, and Pete Tong, plus new talent Afrojack and Avicii. The film received its official premiere at Paris' largest operating movie theatre Le Grand Rex, where it played to over 2,000 fans and guests. Others involved in the production of the documentary included What A Music, Pardeep Sall (Trouble Makers Associates), filmmakers Partizan and innovation house Deviant Venture, and was released as a free podcast on iTunes.

Charts

Weekly charts

Original version

Ultimate version

Ultimate + One More Love

The Electronic Album

2.0 version

Year-end charts

Original version

Ultimate version

2.0 version

Decade-end charts

Certifications

Release history

References 

2011 albums
Albums produced by David Guetta
David Guetta albums
Virgin Records albums